Johann Birnbaum, later Johannes von Birnbaum (born 6 January 1763, Queichheim, now Landau in der Pfalz - 20 May 1832, Zweibrücken) was a jurist in the Electorate of the Palatinate and a president of the "Court of Appeal" (Appellationsgericht) in Zweibrücken.

Honours 
 Ennoblement (Nobilitierung) (1817)
 In his home town of Queichheim, a street has been named "Birnbaum Straße" after him
 While the house in which he was born is no longer standing, a monument has been erected in front of the building which now occupies that address.

Literary works 
 Geschichte der Stadt Landau (1826) ["History of the City of Landau"]

Bibliographies 
 Hans Ziegler: Johannes Birnbaum (1763-1832). Ein Jakobiner aus Queichheim, Landau: Verlag Pfälzer Kunst, 1982.

External links 
 Eltester: Birnbaum, Johann. In Allgemeine Deutsche Biographie (ADB), 2nd volume, pp. 664–665.

18th-century German people
19th-century German people
Jurists from Rhineland-Palatinate
1763 births
1832 deaths
People from Landau